Les Salelles is the name of two communes in France:

 Les Salelles, in the Ardèche department
 Les Salelles, in the Lozère department